The Most of the Animals is the title of a number of different compilation albums by the British blues rock group the Animals. Although track listing varies, all feature only songs from 1964 and 1965. The title is derived from the name of their then producer Mickie Most (see also The Most of Herman's Hermits).

The first album was released in April 1966 by Columbia (SX 6035). Most of the material had not featured on either of their previous two UK LPs. The album reached number four - their highest position so far on the UK album chart (both previous LPs having peaked at number six). It was their final album for EMI-owned Columbia before moving to Decca.

The album was issued on EMI's budget Music for Pleasure label in 1971 (MFP 5218) with a different track listing. This version also charted, reaching number 17. This is the version of the album that has spent the longest in print, being available on LP and cassette throughout the 1970s and 1980s and is still available in extended form on CD. It is also the basis for the 1997 release The Best of the Animals.  Another version was released in 1993 in Australia.

1966 track listing
The album was released by Columbia (EMI) in April 1966.

Side one 
"We Gotta Get Out of This Place" (Barry Mann, Cynthia Weil)
"Don't Let Me Be Misunderstood" (Bennie Benjamin, Sol Marcus, Gloria Caldwell)
"Boom Boom" (John Lee Hooker)
"Baby Let Me Take You Home" (Bob Russell, Wes Farrell)
"Bright Lights, Big City" (Jimmy Reed)
"I'm Crying" (Alan Price, Eric Burdon)
"The House of the Rising Sun" (Traditional, arr. Alan Price)

Side two
"It's My Life" (Roger Atkins, Carl D'Errico)
"Mess Around" (Ahmet Ertegun)
"Dimples" (John Lee Hooker)
"Bring It On Home to Me" (Sam Cooke)
"Gonna Send You Back to Walker" (Matthews/Hammond)
"I'm Mad Again" (John Lee Hooker)
"Talkin' 'bout You" (Ray Charles)

1971 Track listing
Released by Music for Pleasure (EMI) in 1971.

Side one
"The House of the Rising Sun" (Traditional, arr. Alan Price) – 4:32
"We Gotta Get Out of This Place" (Barry Mann, Cynthia Weil) – 3:15
"Road Runner" (Bo Diddley) – 2:51
"Let the Good Times Roll" (Leonard Lee) – 1:56
"Hallelujah I Love Her So" (Ray Charles) – 2:48
"I'm Going to Change the World" (Eric Burdon) – 3:37

Side two
"Bring It On Home to Me" (Sam Cooke) – 2:45
"Worried Life Blues" (M. Merriweather, Wabash) – 4:13
"Baby Let Me Take You Home" (Bob Russell, Wes Farrell) – 2:22
"For Miss Caulker" (Eric Burdon) – 3:59
"I Believe to My Soul" (Ray Charles, Learner) – 3:25
"How You've Changed" (Chuck Berry) – 3:15

CD bonus tracks
"Don't Let Me Be Misunderstood" (Bennie Benjamin, Sol Marcus, Gloria Caldwell) – 2:30
"It's My Life" (Roger Atkins, Carl D'Errico) – 3:09
"Club-A-Gogo" (Eric Burdon, Alan Price) – 2:22
"I'm Crying" (Alan Price, Eric Burdon) – 2:48

1993 Track listing
Released by EMI Music Australia in 1993.

Charts

References 

1971 greatest hits albums 
1993 greatest hits albums
The Animals albums  
Albums produced by Mickie Most
1966 greatest hits albums
Columbia Records compilation albums
EMI Records compilation albums
Music for Pleasure (record label) compilation albums